This is presenting a complete list in alphabetical order of cricketers who have played for North Zone in first-class, List A or Twenty20 matches since the team was formed ahead of the 2012–13 season for the first Bangladesh Cricket League (BCL) competition. North Zone is a composite regional team which combines two divisional teams, Rajshahi and Rangpur. Complying with other team lists, details are the player's name followed by his years active as an North Zone player, current players to the end of the 2015–16 season.

A
 Ariful Haque (2014–15 to 2015–16)

D
 Delwar Hossain (2014–15 to 2015–16)
 Dhiman Ghosh (2015–16)

F
 Farhad Hossain (2012–13 to 2015–16)
 Farhad Reza (2012–13 to 2014–15)

H
 Hamidul Islam (2013–14 to 2014–15)

J
 Jahurul Islam (2012–13 to 2015–16)
 Junaid Siddique (2012–13 to 2015–16)

M
 Mahmudul Hasan (2014–15 to 2015–16)
 Myshukur Rahaman (2012–13 to 2015–16)
 Mamun Hossain (2015–16)
 Muktar Ali (2013–14 to 2015–16)
 Mushfiqur Rahim (2012–13 to 2014–15)

N
 Naeem Islam (2012–13 to 2015–16)
 Nasir Hossain (2012–13 to 2015–16)
 Nazmul Hossain Shanto (2014–15 to 2015–16)
 Nazmul Hossain (2013–14)

S
 Sabbir Rahman (2012–13 to 2014–15)
 Sajidul Islam (2012–13)
 Sanjamul Islam (2012–13 to 2015–16)
 Saqlain Sajib (2012–13 to 2015–16)
 Shafaq Al Zabir (2015–16)
 Shafiul Islam (2012–13)
 Subashis Roy (2012–13 to 2015–16)
 Suhrawadi Shuvo (2012–13 to 2013–14)

T
 Taijul Islam (2013–14 to 2015–16)
 Tanveer Haider (2012–13 to 2013–14)
 Touhid Tareq (2014–15)

References

North Zone